Gao Jin (born April 1959) is a general of the Chinese People's Liberation Army (PLA). Since April 2019, he has served as Director of the Logistic Support Department of the Central Military Commission. Prior to that, he served as the inaugural commander of the PLA Strategic Support Force from 2016 to 2019, President of the PLA Academy of Military Science, and Chief of Staff of the Second Artillery Corps, where he spent most of his career.

Biography 
Gao Jin was born in Jingjiang, Taizhou, Jiangsu province in 1959, to parents who were both PLA soldiers. He joined the PLA in 1978 without telling his family, and spent most of his career in the Second Artillery Corps, China's strategic missile force.

Gao entered the Second Artillery Command College in 1985, and graduated with a master's degree in engineering. Reportedly a battalion commander of the 815th Brigade, of what was, at that time, the PLA's Second Artillery Corps. This unit was reportedly involved in the firing of DF-15 ballistic missiles in the Third Taiwan Strait Crisis and would become this unit's commander in 1997. He then rose through the ranks of the Second Artillery Corps, becoming deputy chief of staff of what was then Base 52 (now Base 61 of the People's Liberation Army Rocket Force) in 2001, chief of staff of Base 52 in 2007 and overall commander in 2009, eventually becoming chief of staff of the Second Artillery Corps in December 2011. In 2012, he was elected an alternate member of the 18th Central Committee of the Chinese Communist Party (2012–2017). He was made a lieutenant general (zhongjiang) in July 2013.

He was promoted twice in 2014, first to assistant chief of the PLA General Staff Department in July, and on December 22, he became President of the PLA Academy of Military Science, the PLA's top research institute, enjoying the same rank as the commanders of the PLA's seven military regions. At age 55, he became the youngest regional chief-level commander of the PLA. He succeeded General Liu Chengjun, who had reached retirement age. On December 31, 2015, as part of wide-ranging reforms of the People's Liberation Army, Gao was named first commander of the PLA Strategic Support Force. On July 28, 2017, Gao was promoted to the rank of General.

Gao has published many academic articles, and has won technological and military awards. The Communist Party mouthpiece People's Daily has praised him as a "technologically powerful military leader."

References

1959 births
Living people
People's Liberation Army generals from Jiangsu
People from Taizhou, Jiangsu
Members of the 19th Central Committee of the Chinese Communist Party